Xijiang may refer to:

a river in China
 Xijiang or Xi River, the western tributary of the Pearl River in China.
 Xijiang or Xi River, a minor tributary of the Jiulong River northwest of Xiamen.

Townships in China
 Xijiang, Liuyang, a township which merged to Guankou subdistrict on November 18 2015, in Liuyang city, Hunan, China.
 Xijiang, Hengyang, a township of Hengyang County, Hunan, China.

Towns in China
 Xijiang, Guizhou, a rural town in Leishan County, Guizhou, China.